"Victrola" is a single by the band Veruca Salt. It was released in 1995 on Minty Fresh Records. It includes a cover of The Knack's "My Sharona".

The cover artwork does not actually depict a Victrola (a brand name of early phonograph with the horn inside a wooden cabinet), but rather an early 20th-century outside horn gramophone or phonograph.

The single was the third release from the album American Thighs but unlike the first two, failed to reach the Top 75 Singles Chart in the UK, peaking at #110.

Track listing

7" single
"Victrola" – 2:19
"My Sharona" – 4:42

CD single
"Victrola" – 2:19
"My Sharona" – 4:42
"Sundown" [live] – 3:23

Personnel
Veruca Salt - artwork
Brad Wood - engineer, mixing
John Leonard - producer
Doug McBride - engineer, mixing
Nina Gordon - guitar, vocals
Louise Post - guitar, vocals
Jim Shapiro - drums

Veruca Salt songs
1995 singles
1994 songs
Songs written by Louise Post